The University of Illinois slush fund scandal was an incident in which the athletic program at the University of Illinois at Urbana–Champaign was investigated and punished for paying players in violation of both NCAA and Big Ten Conference rules from 1962 until its exposure in December 1966.  Although Illinois self-reported the violations, the Fighting Illini were forced to fire football coach Pete Elliott, basketball coach Harry Combes and assistant basketball coach Howie Braun under threat of expulsion from the Big Ten.

References

1960s in Illinois
Academic scandals
College basketball controversies in the United States
College football controversies
Illinois Fighting Illini football
Illinois Fighting Illini men's basketball
Sports scandals in the United States